Constantin Schmid (born 27 November 1999) is a German ski jumper.

Schmid made his World Cup debut in Oberstdorf in December 2016. His best individual World Cup finish is a third place from Râșnov from February 2020. He also has five podiums with the German team, including one win.

Record

FIS World Nordic Ski Championships

FIS Ski Flying World Championships

World Cup

Season standings

Team victories

Individual starts

Podiums

References

External links

1999 births
Living people
German male ski jumpers
People from Rosenheim (district)
Sportspeople from Upper Bavaria
Ski jumpers at the 2022 Winter Olympics
Olympic ski jumpers of Germany
Olympic bronze medalists for Germany
Olympic medalists in ski jumping
Medalists at the 2022 Winter Olympics